Karapandža is a Serbian surname derived from a type of "bogeyman" found in Southeast European folklore. Etymologically, it is Ottoman Turkish in origin and literally means 'black claw'. - see Karakoncolos.

The Jasenovac concentration camp had individual murder victims identified with the surname Karapandža, from Gornja Trebinja, Jazavica and Majske Poljane and from Kupinečki Kraljevec.

People
Stevo Karapandža (born 1947), a popular celebrity chef in former Yugoslavia.
Petar Karapandža (1700s), Habsburg painter and monk
Simo Karapandža
Milan Karapandža
Branko Karapandža
Steven KarapandžaPatient Advocate and Founder of one of the first Compassion Clubs in Michigan, a non profit patient advocacy group.

See also
Kurepa

References

Serbian surnames
Croatian surnames
Kallikantzaros